Preben Larsen (7 September 1922 – 12 November 1965) was a Danish athlete. He competed in the men's triple jump at the 1948 Summer Olympics and the 1952 Summer Olympics.

References

1922 births
1965 deaths
Athletes (track and field) at the 1948 Summer Olympics
Athletes (track and field) at the 1952 Summer Olympics
Danish male triple jumpers
Olympic athletes of Denmark
Place of birth missing